Ambarvale is a suburb of south-western Sydney in the state of New South Wales, Australia. Ambarvale is located 55 kilometres south-west of the Sydney central business district, in the local government area of the City of Campbelltown and is part of the Macarthur region. The suburb is predominantly residential and contains a mix of public and private housing.

History

Aboriginal culture
The history of the region begins over 40,000 years ago and is contained in the continuing culture of the Tharawal people. The surrounding land still contains reminders of their past lives in rock engravings, cave paintings, axe grinding grooves and shell middens.

European settlement
The suburb draws its name from a property established in 1816 by former convict Samuel Larkin. The property was actually where modern day St Helens Park is located. One of the earliest properties in what is now known as Ambarvale was a dairy farm called Glen Lora. In 1972, the farms were sold for housing and the new suburb was officially opened in 1976.

Demographics
According to the 2016 census of population, there were 169,420 people in Ambarvale.
 Aboriginal and Torres Strait Islander people made up 5.7% of the population. 
 67.1% of people were born in Australia. The most next most common countries of birth were New Zealand 2.8%, Philippines 2.4% and England 2.2%.
 70.9% of people only spoke English at home. Other languages spoken at home included Arabic 2.8%, Spanish 2.4% and Samoan 2.2%. 
 The most common responses for religion were Catholic 28.5%, No Religion 21.1% and Anglican 16.9%.

Commercial area
Ambarvale has an ALDI shopping centre on Woodhouse Drive. This was completed early in 2010, with the old shopping centre being demolished. Beside ALDI is the Ambarvale Tavern, which has a bistro and gambling facilities. Just north of the suburb is Macarthur Square shopping centre, one of the largest shopping centres in southwestern Sydney.

Transport
Macarthur railway station is located just north of Ambarvale, providing connection to Campbelltown Liverpool and Sydney CBD via the Airport & South Line of the Sydney Trains network. NSW TrainLink also services Macarthur providing connections to the Southern Highlands, Canberra, Griffith and Melbourne. Bus services are provided by Busabout and Interline Bus Services, leaving from Kellicar Road (under the bridge). The routes are 870–4, 886–89, 890–98 to and from Campbelltown.

Schools
The suburb contains two public primary schools, Ambarvale Public and Thomas Acres Public, plus one public high school, Thomas Reddall High School. The high school named Ambarvale High School is actually located in Rosemeadow.

Housing
The majority of housing in Ambarvale is in the form of detached houses although attached houses and walk-up flats also exist. The majority of dwellings in Ambarvale were constructed in the 1970s and 1980s.

References

Suburbs of Sydney
Towns in the Macarthur (New South Wales)
City of Campbelltown (New South Wales)